The Crossing is the debut album released by Scottish band Big Country. The album reached #3 in the UK; overseas, it hit #4 in Canada on the RPM national Top Albums Chart and #18 in the US on the Billboard 200 in 1983. It went on to be certified platinum in the UK and Canada. It contains the song "In a Big Country" which is their only U.S. Top 40 hit single. Stuart Adamson and fellow guitarist Bruce Watson used the MXR Pitch Transposer 129 effect pedal to create a guitar sound reminiscent of bagpipes. Also contributing to the band's unique sound was their use of the e-bow, a hand-held device which, through the use of magnets, causes the strings of an electric guitar to vibrate producing a soft attack which sounds more like strings or synthesizer.

The album has been remastered and reissued on three occasions. The latest version released by Universal in 2012 in advance of the album's 30th anniversary includes a second disc of previously unissued demos. Also included in the set is a track produced by Chris Thomas from the first abortive attempt to record the band's debut album. The demos include the earliest recordings done by Adamson and Bruce Watson, some of which were recorded on four-track prior to recruiting either a drummer or bassist for the band.

The set also includes a booklet with interviews (new in the case of the current band members and archived in the case of the late Stuart Adamson) by the journalist and author Tim Barr. Lyrics for all of the key songs are also included, and the album has been remastered by Paschal Byrne from the original master tapes. In total, ten previously unreleased tracks were included in the deluxe, digitally remastered edition.

Music and Lyrics
The songs on The Crossing deal with topics including loss ("Inwards," "Chance"), separation ("Close Action"), dehumanization ("Lost Patrol"), and the 1745 Jacobite Rebellion ("The Storm"). Many of the songs are characterized by Brzezicki's highly-compressed drums and the heavily effects-treated, layered guitars of Adamson and Watson. The music often demonstrates a clear influence of Scottish traditional music, particularly obvious in the pipe-band rhythms of "In a Big Country" and "Fields of Fire" and the swirling, Gaelic guitar intro to "The Storm." This caused the band to be categorized as a Celtic rock band, which sometimes led to unfavorable comparisons with other bands such as Thin Lizzy.

Reception

Critic Kurt Loder of Rolling Stone gave the album a glowing review, writing:

Track listings
All songs written by Stuart Adamson, Mark Brzezicki, Tony Butler, Bruce Watson, except as indicated. On the USA vinyl LP, the songs "1000 Stars" and "Fields of Fire" are in reversed order. The USA CD release keeps the same order as below.

Side one
 "In a Big Country" – 4:44
 "Inwards" – 4:36
 "Chance" – 4:26
 "1000 Stars" – 3:50
 "The Storm" – 6:19

Side two
 "Harvest Home" – 4:19
 "Lost Patrol" – 4:52
 "Close Action" – 4:15
 "Fields of Fire (400 Miles)" – 3:31
 "Porrohman" – 7:52

Additional tracks (cassette release)
 "Angle Park" (Adamson, Watson) – 4:08
 "Fields of Fire (400 Miles)" (Alternate Mix) – 5:19
 "Heart & Soul" – 5:13
 "In a Big Country" (Pure Mix) (Listed as '12" Mix') – 6:19

1996 re-issue
Bonus tracks:
 "Angle Park" (Adamson, Watson) – 4:08
 "All of Us" – 4:09
 "The Crossing" – 7:09
 "Heart & Soul" – 4:33 (This version fades out earlier than the version on the 1983 cassette release)

Wonderland EP (US, 1984)
 "Wonderland" – 3:56
 "All Fall Together" – 5:05
 "Angle Park" (Adamson, Watson) – 4:07
 "The Crossing" – 7:04

Wonderland EP (Canada, 1984)
 "Wonderland" – 3:58
 "Angle Park" – 4:08
 "All Fall Together" – 5:16
 "Chance" (Extended Re-Mix) – 6:10
 "Heart and Soul" – 5:13
 "The Crossing" – 7:10

Wonderland EP (US only, 2002)

 "Wonderland" – 3:58
 "All Fall Together" (Jimmy Iovine remix) – 5:16
 "Angle Park" (Adamson, Watson) – 4:08
 "The Crossing" – 7:10
 "Chance" (re-recorded single version) – 4:37

2012 re-issue
Disc 1 (bonus tracks)
 "Balcony"
 "Flag of Nations (Swimming)"
 "Angle Park" 
 "All of Us"
 "Heart and Soul"
 "The Crossing"
 "Tracks of My Tears" (Live)

Disc 2
 "Angle Park" (Demo)
 "Harvest Home" (Demo)
 "We Could Laugh" (Demo)
 "In a Big Country" (Demo)
 "The Storm" (Demo)
 "Big City" (Demo)
 "Fields of Fire" (Riverside BBC TV)
 "Lost Patrol" (Demo)
 "Inwards" (Demo)
 "1000 Stars"
 "Lost Patrol"
 "Inwards"
 "Close Action"
 "Fields of Fire" (Demo)
 "1000 Stars" (Demo)
 "Ring Out Bells" (Demo)
 "Chance" (Demo)

Personnel
Big Country
Stuart Adamson – vocals, guitar, piano, e-bow
Bruce Watson – guitar, mandolin, sitar, vocals, e-bow
Tony Butler – bass, vocals
Mark Brzezicki – drums, percussion, vocals
with:
Christine Beveridge – additional vocals

Chart performance
Album

Single

Certifications

References

Big Country albums
1983 debut albums
Albums produced by Steve Lillywhite
Mercury Records albums
Albums recorded at RAK Studios